Jiangwan Town  is a township-level division of Yilan County, Harbin Prefecture-level city, Heilongjiang Province, China.

See also
List of township-level divisions of Heilongjiang

References

Township-level divisions of Heilongjiang